The Sanremo Music Festival 1998 was the 48th annual Sanremo Music Festival, held at the Teatro Ariston in Sanremo, province of Imperia, in the late February 1998 and broadcast by Rai 1.

The show was presented by Raimondo Vianello, supported by Eva Herzigová and Veronica Pivetti.

According to the rules of this edition, the winner and the two runner-up  of  the "Newcomers" section were allowed in the final night to compete in the Big Artists section; Annalisa Minetti was eventually able to win both the competitions with the song "Senza te o con te".

Piccola Orchestra Avion Travel won the Mia Martini Critics Award with the song "Dormi e sogna", while the duo Eramo & Passavanti won the Critics Award for the Newcomers section.

For the newcomers, only the winner was revealed; for the big artists section, initially only the first three positions were announced, while the complete final ranking was disclosed only several weeks after the end of the festival.

The "Quality Jury", responsible for rewarding best music, best lyrics and best arrangements, consisted of composer Michael Nyman, singer-songwriter Roberto Vecchioni, writer Vincenzo Cerami, record producer Celso Valli and vice-president of Rome-Europe Foundation Monique Vaute.

After every night, Piero Chiambretti and Nino D'Angelo hosted DopoFestival, a talk show about the Festival with the participation of singers and journalists.

Participants and results

Big Artists

Newcomers

Guests

References 

Sanremo Music Festival by year
1998 in Italian music 
1998 in Italian television 
1998 music festivals